Taj ol Din (also Romanized as Tāj ol Dīn, Tāj od Dīn, and Tāj ed Dīn; also known as Tazadin and Tāzeh Deh) is a village in Takab Rural District, in the Central District of Dargaz County, Razavi Khorasan Province, Iran. At the 2006 census, its population was 1,083, in 305 families.

References 

Populated places in Dargaz County